Les Hooper (born 27 February 1940 in Baton Rouge, Louisiana) is a composer in Los Angeles, US.  His music ranges from classical to blues and jazz; from commercials to concert commissions. His credits include films, television, commercials, live performances, orchestral commissions, and many published pieces of music.  He has won an Emmy Award and has had seven Grammy nominations, as well as Clio and film festival awards.

Filmography
 Finney (1969) 
 A Man Called Sloane (1979) 
 Foxfire Light - Composer, Conductor  (1982)     
 State of the Union (1984)       
 Hostages (1984)
 Out-of-Time Step (1984)  
 Solar Crisis  (1990)  
 The Player (1992) 
 Back in the USSR (1992)  
 The Road Killers (1994) 
 At the Hands of Another (1997)  
 New American Heroes: The 1999 Senior Olympics (1999)
 Rocket's Red Glare (2000) 
 Killing Christian (2003)  
 Damaged - Composer (2003)

Television credits (partial)

Discography

Les Hooper Big Band (Chicago Band) 
 Look what they've done 
 Dorian Blue

Les Hooper Big Band (L.A. Band) 
 Raisin' the Roof
 Anything Goes  
 Out of the Woods (Released December 5, 2006)
 Live at Typhoon

Hoopla 
 Hoopla 1
 Hoopla 2
 Hoopla 3

Other 
 Mirage
 Afrikka
 Crossing the Line
 For the Children
 Winterscapes 
 Hoopla 3

Awards and nominations
 Emmy  "The Newperformers" NBC 
 Clio  "United Airlines Commercial"
 Grammy  "Look What They've Done" Album (nomination)
 Grammy "Raisin the Roof" Album (nomination)
 Grammy "The Four of Us" Album (nomination)
 Grammy "Easy to Love" Album (nomination)
 Grammy "Anything Goes" Album (nomination)

References

External links
 - personal website
 

1940 births
Living people
Musicians from Baton Rouge, Louisiana
American male classical composers
American classical composers
American film score composers
American television composers
American jazz bandleaders
Big band bandleaders
Pausa Records artists
Jazz musicians from Louisiana
American male film score composers
American male jazz musicians